Avraham Faust is an Israeli archaeologist and professor at Bar-Ilan University. He directs excavations at Tel 'Eton, widely regarded as the probable site of biblical Eglon.

Selected publications

The Israelite Society in the Period of the Monarchy: an Archaeological Perspective (2005) (in Hebrew)
Israel’s Ethnogenesis: Settlement, Interaction,  Expansion and  Resistance (2006) (Irene Levi-Sala Prizein the Archaeology of Israel 2008; G. Ernest Wright Book Award of the American School of Oriental Research; Biblical Archaeology Society Publication Award (2009)
 The Archaeology of Israelite Society in Iron Age II  (2012)
Judah in the Neo-Babylonian Period: The Archaeology of Desolation (2012)
 with Safrai, Z.  The Settlement History of Ancient Israel: A Quantitative Analysis (2015)
 The Neo-Assyrian Empire in the Southwest: Imperial Domination and its Consequences (2021)

References

Year of birth missing (living people)
Living people
Archaeologists of the Near East
Academic staff of Bar-Ilan University
Israeli archaeologists